Eugene Henry Cozzens Leutze (16 November 1847 – 1 September 1931) was an admiral of the United States Navy.

Biography

He was born on 16 November 1847 to Emanuel Leutze in Düsseldorf, Prussia. Appointed to the United States Naval Academy by President Abraham Lincoln in 1863, he witnessed part of the Civil War on board the blockade ship  the following summer.

His early career brought Leutze various surveying assignments, especially in Central America. As captain of  during the Spanish–American War, he sailed to reinforce Admiral George Dewey's fleet at Manila, and was present when the city capitulated.

A fine administrator, he was promoted to rear admiral in 1907 while Superintendent of the Naval Gun Factory and Commandant of the Washington Navy Yard, Washington, D.C. Admiral Leutze ended his active career as Commandant of both the 3rd Naval District and the New York Navy Yard on 6 June 1912. He died at Brooklyn Naval Hospital on 1 September 1931.

He was interred at Arlington National Cemetery on 17 September 1931 without any "pomp and ritual" at his own request.

Namesake
In 1942, the destroyer  was named in his honor.

Leutze Park, the main parade ground at the Washington Navy Yard, is named in his honor. It is used for official change-of-command and retirement ceremonies.

References

External links
 Eugene Henry Cozzens Leutze Log, 1926, MS 531 held by Special Collections & Archives, Nimitz Library at the United States Naval Academy

1847 births
1931 deaths
United States Navy admirals
German emigrants to the United States
Union Navy officers
Burials at Arlington National Cemetery